Pound Creek is a small town located in Bass Coast Shire in Victoria, Australia. It is 8 kilometres from Inverloch and 22 kilometres from Leongatha. The town is named after the creek of the same name, which runs into Anderson's Inlet and its basin commences northeast of Millars Road and south of Holgates Road in Leongatha South.

The central business district of Pound Creek is generally considered along Inverloch - Venus Bay road (route number C442) where the Country Fire Authority base and tennis courts are located, although anywhere adjacent to the water body of the same name is technically considered the centre of the Pound Creek suburb of the Bass Coast Shire.

References 

Towns in Victoria (Australia)
Bass Coast Shire